is the second single of the Hello! Project duo .

The single was released on the hachama label on October 18, 2006 with a catalogue number of HKCN-50042 for the CD version and HKCN-50040 for the CD+DVD version. A Single V DVD with the PV of the song was released on November 15, 2006 with the catalogue number HKBN-50074, again on the hachama label.

Track listings

CD 
  "Melodies"
  "Melodies (Piano Version)"
  "Melodies (Instrumental)"

Single V DVD 
  "Melodies"
  "Melodies (Dance Shot Ver.)"

Trivia 
 At the end of the complete version of the "Melodies" PV, both Aya Matsuura and Miki Fujimoto kissed each other. The video that was broadcast on Japanese television was ended abruptly before the kiss.

External links 
 Up-Front Works Discography entries: CD, DVD

Hello! Project songs
2006 singles
2006 songs
Song recordings produced by Tsunku